Eospilarctia lewisii is a moth of the family Erebidae first described by Arthur Gardiner Butler in 1885. It is found on the Japanese islands of Honshu, Shikoku, Kyushu and Tsushima.

References

Moths described in 1885
Spilosomina
Moths of Japan